Wilfredo Iraheta Sanabria (born February 22, 1967) is a retired Salvadoran football (soccer) player who played as a defender.

He is currently a politician.

Club career
Iraheta started playing football in the streets of his hometown and joined then second division side Sesuntepeque at 15 years of age. At 20 he joined Chalatenango and later played for Atlético Marte. In 1994 his father was killed during the civil war and he moved to Águila to play alongside 41-year-old veteran Luis Ramírez Zapata, then Luis Ángel Firpo and FAS with whom he finished playing actively to pursue a career in politics.

Iraheta was a versatile and sturdy defender whose strength in the air and tackling made instant success, also gaining a spot in the national squad on several occasions. He has played in virtually every outfield position. In 2001, he retired from both international and domestic football bringing an end to a marvellous career.

International career
Iraheta made his debut for El Salvador in a December 1995 UNCAF Nations Cup match against Costa Rica and has earned a total of 37 caps, scoring 2 goals. He has represented his country in 11 FIFA World Cup qualification matches and played at the 1995 and 1997 UNCAF Nations Cups as well as at the 1996 and 1998 CONCACAF Gold Cups.

His final international match was a November 1998 friendly match against Honduras.

International goals
Scores and results list El Salvador's goal tally first.

Personal life and after retirement
Iraheta married Patricia Iraheta and they have four children: William, Maria Jose, Alejandra and Ximena. Since 1995, he has a degree in medicine which earned him the nickname Doctor, and he has also entered into politics.

In February 2011, Iraheta was candidate to become mayor of San Salvador.

Honours
 Luis Ángel Firpo
Primera División de Fútbol Profesional (1): 1998

References

External links

 Player profile - CD FAS

1967 births
Living people
People from Sensuntepeque
Association football defenders
Salvadoran footballers
El Salvador international footballers
1996 CONCACAF Gold Cup players
1998 CONCACAF Gold Cup players
C.D. Chalatenango footballers
C.D. Atlético Marte footballers
C.D. Águila footballers
C.D. Luis Ángel Firpo footballers
C.D. FAS footballers
Sportsperson-politicians